Nick J. Lappin (born November 1, 1992) is an American professional ice hockey right winger who currently plays for HC Bolzano of the ICE Hockey League (ICEHL). He formerly played for the New Jersey Devils in the National Hockey League (NHL). Lappin is the son of former NHL hockey player, Peter Lappin.

Playing career
As a youth, Lappin played in the 2005 Quebec International Pee-Wee Hockey Tournament with the Chicago Mission minor ice hockey team.

Undrafted, Lappin played collegiate hockey with Brown University of the ECAC. Upon completing his senior year in the 2015–16 season, with 33 points in just 31 games, Lappin was signed by the New Jersey Devils to a two-year entry-level deal on March 9, 2016. He soon made his professional debut with the Devils AHL affiliate namesake, in Albany, appearing in 12 games for 7 points. In the post-season, Lappin continued his immediate contribution with 5 goals and 7 points in 11 games.

In his first full professional season in 2016–17, Lappin made his NHL debut for the Devils on October 28, 2016 against the Chicago Blackhawks. He recorded his first NHL point with an assist one night later against the Tampa Bay Lightning. On November 8, 2016, Lappin scored his first NHL goal in a 3–2 win against the Carolina Hurricanes.

On July 1, 2019, Lappin left the Devils organization after 5 seasons to sign as a free agent on a one-year, two-way contract with the St. Louis Blues for the 2019–20 campaign. Assigned to AHL affiliate, the San Antonio Rampage, for the duration of his contract with the Blues, Lappin produced just 5 goals and 11 points through 42 regular season games before the season was cancelled due to the COVID-19 pandemic.

As a free agent from the Blues and going un-signed leading into the pandemic delayed 2020–21 season, Lappin was signed to a one-year AHL contract with the Cleveland Monsters, affiliate of the Columbus Blue Jackets, on January 21, 2021.

Lappin remained a free agent with the 2021–22 season underway, before opting to sign a professional try-out contract with the Lehigh Valley Phantoms of the AHL, affiliate to the Philadelphia Flyers, on November 23, 2021.

Following the conclusion of his contract with the Phantoms, Lappin opted to halt his North American career in agreeing to a contract with Italian based club, HC Bolzano of the ICEHL, on July 22, 2022.

Career statistics

References

External links

1992 births
Living people
Albany Devils players
American men's ice hockey right wingers
Binghamton Devils players
Brown Bears men's ice hockey players
Cedar Rapids RoughRiders players
Cleveland Monsters players
Lehigh Valley Phantoms players
New Jersey Devils players
San Antonio Rampage players
Tri-City Storm players
Undrafted National Hockey League players
Ice hockey players from Illinois